The Miss Tierra República Dominicana 2004 pageant was held on June 20, 2004. This year, 25 candidates competed for the national crown. The winner represented the Dominican Republic at the Miss Earth 2004, which was held in Manila.

Results

Miss Tierra República Dominicana 2004 : Nileny Estevez Dippton (Santiago Rodríguez)
1st Runner Up : Laura Fabre (Com. Dom. Puerto Rico)
2nd Runner Up  : Rachel Zafrio (Santiago)
3rd Runner Up  : Carina Almeida (Puerto Plata)
4th Runner Up  : Wilma Perez (Samaná)

Top 12

Niurca de Mota (La Vega)
Sofya Arces (Distrito Nacional)
Clara Abreu (Cotuí)
Ana Rivera (San Cristóbal)
Mily Sosa (Hato Mayor)
Janet Mora (Monte Plata)
Lisa Matos (San Pedro de Macorís)

Special awards
 Miss Photogenic (voted by press reporters) - Andrea Ferro (San Francisco de Macorís)
 Miss Congeniality (voted by contestants) - Margarita Ramos (Valverde)
 Best Face - Laura Fabre (Com. Dom. Puerto Rico)
 Best Provincial Costume - Carina Almeida (Puerto Plata)
 Miss Cultura - Janet Mora (Monte Plata)
 Miss Elegancia - Clara Abreu (Cotuí)

Delegates

Miss Dominican Republic
2004 beauty pageants
2004 in the Dominican Republic